Thomas Mann Baynes (1794–1876) was an English artist and lithographer. He is known for his drawings and watercolours of landscapes, buildings and outdoor events.

Life
He was London born, and is probably the son of James Baynes, a noted watercolour artist. He produced views of Liverpool and Ireland, and appears to have made a successful living as a printer.

Works

Thomas Mann Baynes' works include:

Views on the River Thames in London
View of the Canterbury and Whitstable Railway From Over the Tunnel, Taken on the Opening Day, May 3, 1830
The Giant's Causeway
 Phenakistiscope discs

Many of his subjects were engraved and published, generally in London. A notable panorama of the River Thames was drawn from nature and engraved on stone.

Family
Fredrick Thomas Baynes (1824–1874) also a watercolour artist, was probably his son.

Notes

External links
The Landing of Dona Maria (1828 lithograph - Falmouth Art Gallery)
View of Greenwich Hospital (1823 watercolour - Courtauld Institute of Art)
2 works by Baynes (Brighton & Hove museums)
 Paintings for Fisher's Drawing Room Scrap Books with poetical illustrations by Letitia Elizabeth Landon:
1832: An engraving by J Davies of 
1832: An engraving by W Le Petit of  
1836: An engraving by Samuel Lacey of  

1794 births
1876 deaths
19th-century English painters
English male painters
Landscape artists
English watercolourists
English lithographers
19th-century English male artists